A Viral Wedding is a 2020 Indian Miniseries of 8 episodes produced by A D2R Indie and Eros Motion Pictures. It is featured as a Eros Now Quickie and available for streaming at Eros Now. The web-series is written and directed by Shreya Dhanwanthary who is even the main lead in the series. The entire series was shot during the lockdown with the actors and the crew staying indoors at their respective homes. The micro-series also stars Amol Parashar, Mohit Raina, Sonali Sachdev and Sharib Hashmi.

Plot 
Nisha and Rishabh had planned the perfect wedding, but the coronavirus lockdown may require a change of plans.

Cast 

 Shreya Dhanwanthary as Nisha Ahuja
 Amol Parashar as Rishabh Sinha
 Mohit Raina as Yudhisthir Kaul aka Yudi
 Sonali Sachdev as Neena Ahuja
 Sunny Hinduja as Nishant Ahuja
 Aritro Banerjee as Imtiyaz Baig
 Aishwarya Choudhary as Aditi Jha
 Sharib Hashmi as Ujjwal Pujari aka UP

Reception 
Film critic Rajeev Masand in his video said, "It was only a matter of time, and it was always going to be about who did it first."  National Herald India mentioned, “A Viral Wedding is a light-hearted attempt to bring smiles to people’s faces during this time social distancing.”

References 

2020 web series debuts
Indian web series
Hindi-language web series